The Koster Islands (Swedish: Kosteröarna) situated 10 km west of Strömstad, Sweden, comprises an archipelago surrounding the two largest islands, South Koster and North Koster. South Koster has an area of 8 km2 and North Koster an area of 4 km2. The landscape, dominated by smooth bedrock, bears witness to volcanic activity and subsequent wear due to the Ice Age. The rocky coastline is broken by many sandy beaches the largest being Kilesand on South Koster's east side overlooking the 200 meter deep Koster Fjord.

Communities 

South and North Koster are communities with a permanent population of around 340. There is a school, sports hall, shops, church, and galleries where handcrafts and arts are exhibited. Both farming and fishing are important, and during the 1600s Koster exported lobster to Holland. There are several small harbors, popular with sailors from both near and far. Rooms can be rented from the Ekenäs Hotel or from private homes or cabins. There is also a campsite on North Koster.

An electrically-driven ferry operates constantly between the two islands, a distance of 58 meters. As one moves inland, farmland, woods and rich vegetation becomes apparent and there are many trails. South Koster has a network of roads and paths, which can be explored by bicycle or in small golf buggies, both of which can be rented. On North Koster, it is also possible to rent small boats. Restrictions regarding the right of access, Allemansrätten, forbid open fires, and camping is only allowed at the designated campsite. Private cars are not permitted.

Climate 
The Koster Islands have a marine west coast climate that has a narrower range of temperatures than inland and areas on the east coast on similar parallels. The islands have a small diurnal temperature variation resulting in mild night time temperatures with frosts being less common than expected for areas on similar parallels both in Sweden and globally. Still yet, sleet was recorded on Nordkoster as late as June 12, 1981, at a temperature of only +2.7 °C.

Tourism on the islands 

Koster is a well-established and popular tourist destination, attracting as many as 90,000 tourists each year, renowned for being one of Sweden's sunniest places offering bathing opportunities. During the summer there are a variety of events and activities, such as a music festival, mackerel race, and trips to the seal colonies. Several pubs and restaurants offer a varied menu, often based on seafood from local fishermen, such as shrimp, oyster, crayfish, crab, and lobster.

Connections to the mainland are good with sixteen ferry departures daily from Strömstad, a crossing of around 45 minutes. Private cars can be parked at the car park just outside the center of Strömstad from where buses run free of charge to the harbor square.

Gallery

References

Additional sources 
 Kosterbladet 2010

External links 
 Koster: Islands in the Skagerrak
 Map of Koster Islands

Archipelagoes of Sweden
Islands on the Swedish West Coast
Landforms of Västra Götaland County
Islands of Västra Götaland County